J. H. (James Hurst) Hawthornthwaite (1869 – November 1, 1926) was an Irish-born land agent, businessman and political figure in British Columbia. He represented Nanaimo City from 1901 to 1908 and from 1909 to 1912 as a Socialist and Newcastle from 1918 to 1920 as an Independent Socialist in the Legislative Assembly of British Columbia.

He was born in County Westmeath and educated in England. Hawthornthwaite came to British Columbia during the 1880s. He worked as a secretary for the American consulate in Victoria and the New Vancouver Coal Mining and Land Company Limited. In 1890, he married Elizabeth "Ada" Bate. Hawthornthwaite helped develop a workmen's compensation act in 1902. He also lobbied for improved safety standards and labour reforms in the mining industry. He was a founding member of the Socialist Party of Canada in 1904. He resigned his seat in 1908 to run unsuccessfully in the federal riding of Nanaimo. Hawthornthwaite was able to regain his seat in a by-election held the following year. In 1912, the Socialist Party in Nanaimo became part of the Social Democratic Party of Canada and Hawthornthwaite was not chosen as a candidate. He was later elected to the assembly in a 1918 by-election held in Newcastle after Parker Williams resigned his seat. Hawthornthwaite died in 1926 in Victoria.

References

External links 
Records of James Hurst Hawthornthwaite are held by Simon Fraser University's Special Collections and Rare Books

1869 births
1926 deaths
British Columbia Socialist Party MLAs
Irish emigrants to Canada (before 1923)
Politicians from County Westmeath
Socialist Party of Canada politicians